Loïc Bessilé (born 19 February 1999) is a professional footballer who plays as a defender for Belgian club Eupen on loan from Charleroi. Born in France, he represents the Togo national team.

Club career
On 8 July 2020, Bessilé signed his first professional contract with Bordeaux.

On 31 August 2021, he moved to Charleroi in Belgium.

On 31 January 2023, Bessilé was loaned by Eupen until the end of the season.

International career
Bessilé was born in France to a Cameroonian father and Togolese mother. He is a youth international for France. He debuted for the Togo national team in a friendly 1–1 tie with Sudan on 12 October 2020.

References

External links
 
 FFF Prfile
 Girondins Profile
 

1999 births
Living people
Footballers from Toulouse
Citizens of Togo through descent
Togolese footballers
Association football defenders
French footballers
Togo international footballers
France youth international footballers
Togolese people of Cameroonian descent
French sportspeople of Togolese descent
French sportspeople of Cameroonian descent
FC Girondins de Bordeaux players
Toulouse FC players
R. Charleroi S.C. players
K.A.S. Eupen players
Ligue 1 players
Championnat National 3 players
Belgian Pro League players
Belgian National Division 1 players
Togolese expatriate footballers
Expatriate footballers in Belgium
Togolese expatriate sportspeople in Belgium